i2, I-2, I 2 or I2 may refer to:
 I2, a statistical  measure of study heterogeneity used in meta-analysis
 I2, a military acronym for an image intensifier
 I2, the chemical formula for molecular iodine
 I2 engine, a designation for a straight-twin engine
 i2 Group, a visual investigative analysis software company
 i2 Technologies, an international supply chain management firm
 Haplogroup I2 (Y-DNA), the human Y-chromosomal haplogroup
 LB&SCR I2 class, a 1907 British class of 4-4-2 steam tank locomotive
 Grigorovich I-2, a biplane fighter aircraft of the Soviet Union
 Internet2, a not-for-profit US computer networking consortium
 Interstate 2, a highway in the US state of Texas
 Göta Life Guards (infantry) (1816–1939), a Swedish Army infantry regiment
 Värmland Regiment (1939–1973), a Swedish Army infantry regiment
 I2, a rank-into-rank axiom in mathematical set theory
 Incredibles 2, a 2018 American computer-animated superhero film by Pixar
 Iberia Express, a Spanish low-cost airline (IATA code: I2)
 , a Type J1 submarine of the Imperial Japanese Navy

See also
 I 2 (EYE), a 1988 album by Michael W. Smith
 i2 Aquarii, a star
 Interstate 2 (disambiguation)